England competed at the 1966 British Empire and Commonwealth Games in Kingston, Jamaica, from 4 - 13 August 1966.    

England finished at the top of the medal table.

Medal table (top three)

The athletes that competed are listed below.

Athletics

Badminton

Boxing

Cycling

Diving

Fencing

Shooting

Swimming

Weightlifting

Wrestling

References

1966
Nations at the 1966 British Empire and Commonwealth Games
British Empire and Commonwealth Games